Now That's What I Call Music! (simply titled NOW) was released on October 27, 1998. Modeled after the highly successful Now That's What I Call Music! series in the United Kingdom, which compiles a number of songs that are popular around the time of its release, this album is the first edition of the Now! series in the United States.

In following the success of its UK predecessors, this first U.S. version of Now! reached platinum status as certified by the RIAA. The compilation includes three songs that reached number one on the Billboard Hot 100: "Together Again, "All My Life" and "MMMBop". The album peaked at number 10 on the Billboard 200 in January 1999.

Track listing

Charts

Weekly charts

Year-end charts

References

1998 compilation albums
 001
Virgin Records compilation albums